Hornera is a genus of bryozoans belonging to the family Horneridae.

The genus has cosmopolitan distribution.

Species:

Hornera airensis 
Hornera americana 
Hornera andegavensis 
Hornera annulata 
Hornera antarctica 
Hornera arbuscula 
Hornera asperula 
Hornera australis 
Hornera bipunctata 
Hornera brancoensis 
Hornera caespitosa 
Hornera canaliculata 
Hornera canui 
Hornera cerviformis 
Hornera circumporosa 
Hornera circumsulcata 
Hornera claibornensis 
Hornera clavata 
Hornera concatenata 
Hornera crispa 
Hornera currieae 
Hornera curva 
Hornera curvirostra 
Hornera darchiaci 
Hornera densipunctata 
Hornera diffusa 
Hornera dorsocavata 
Hornera edwardsii 
Hornera elegans 
Hornera elevata 
Hornera erugata 
Hornera falklandica 
Hornera farehamensis 
Hornera fibrosa 
Hornera foliacea 
Hornera frondiculata 
Hornera galeata 
Hornera haueri 
Hornera hippolithus 
Hornera humilis 
Hornera hybrida 
Hornera infundibulata 
Hornera involuta 
Hornera jacksonica 
Hornera jeongsangi 
Hornera lamellosa 
Hornera lasarevi 
Hornera lataramae 
Hornera lichenoides 
Hornera lunata 
Hornera lunularis 
Hornera mediterranea 
Hornera nitens 
Hornera nummulitorum 
Hornera pacifica 
Hornera parasitica 
Hornera pectinata 
Hornera pertusa 
Hornera polyporoides 
Hornera prominens 
Hornera pseudolichenoides 
Hornera quadrata 
Hornera radians 
Hornera ramosa 
Hornera reteporacea 
Hornera reteramae 
Hornera reticulata 
Hornera rhipis 
Hornera rhomboidalis 
Hornera robusta 
Hornera rubeschi 
Hornera rugulosa 
Hornera seriatopora 
Hornera serrata 
Hornera serrata 
Hornera simplicissima 
Hornera smitti 
Hornera sparsipora 
Hornera striata 
Hornera subannulata 
Hornera sulcata 
Hornera sulcosa 
Hornera tenuirama 
Hornera tenuis 
Hornera tortuosa 
Hornera trabecularis 
Hornera truncatuloides 
Hornera tuberculata 
Hornera tuberosa 
Hornera verrucosa 
Hornera versipalma 
Hornera waipukurensis

References

Bryozoan genera